Badho Bahu is an Indian Hindi romantic drama television series, airs on &TV. The show premiered on September 12, 2016. The series is produced by Sunny Side Up and Hum Tum Tele Films. It starred Rytasha Rathore and Prince Narula in the lead roles of Komal and Lakhan respectively. The show went off air on 17 May 2018. It has been remade in Kannada as Brahmagantu on Zee Kannada, in Tamil as Oru Oorla Oru Rajakumari on Zee Tamil, in Malayalam as Swathi Nakshatram Chothi on Zee Keralam, in Telugu as Gundamma Katha on Zee Telugu and in Indonesia as Si Mantu Besar on ZeeBioskop.

Plot
Badho Bahu revolves around an overweight girl, Komal, who gets nicknamed Badho because of her physical appearance. Komal is made to do tough manual tasks which need physical strength. She is sweet, loving, energetic and a simple girl. She has a big heart and helps most people in her town. Lucky Singh Ahlawat is a famous wrestler and is known for his looks. A series of events leads to Komal and Lucky getting married.

Cast

Main
Rytasha Rathore as Komal Shamsher Singh / Komal Laakha Singh Ahlawat (Badho): Jamuna and Shamsher's daughter, Prithvi and Vardaan's sister, Lucky's wife, Raghubir and Malti's daughter-in-law (2016–2018)
Prince Narula as Laakha Raghubir Singh Ahlawat (Lucky): Raghubir and Malti's son; Kailash and Chhoto's nephew; Rana and Pragya's cousin; Badho's husband; Shamsher and Jamuna's son-in-law (2016–2018)

Recurring
Pankaj Dheer as Raghubir Singh Ahlawat: Kailash and Chhoto's brother; Malti's husband; Lucky's father; Rana and Pragya's uncle; Badho's father-in-law (2016–2018)
Jaya Ojha as Malti Raghubir Singh Ahlawat: Raghubir's wife; Lucky's mother; Rana and Pragya's aunt; Badho's mother-in-law (2016–2018)
Arhaan Khan as Ranbir "Rana" Kailash Singh Ahlawat: Kailash and Kamla's son; Raghubir and Chhoto's nephew; Pragya's brother; Lucky's cousin brother; Pinky's husband (2016–2018)
Antara Banerjee as Pinky Ranbir Singh Ahlawat: Rana's wife; Kamla and Kailash's daughter-in-law (2016–2018)
Karmveer Choudhary as Kailash Singh Ahlawat: Raghubir and Chhoto's brother; Kamla's husband; Lucky's uncle; Rana and Pragya's father; Pinky and Vardaan's father-in-law (2016–2018)
Sangeeta Panwar as Kamla Kailash Singh Ahlawat: Kailash's wife; Lucky's aunt; Rana and Pragya's mother; Pinky and Vardaan's mother-in-law (2016–2018)
Nishi Singh / Ashima Khan as Pragya Kailash Singh Ahlawat / Pragya Vardaan Singh: Kamla and Kailash's son; Rana's sister; Lucky's cousin sister; Vardaan's wife; Shamsher and Jamuna's daughter-in-law (2016–2018)
Geeta Udeshi as Jamuna Shamsher Singh: Shamsher's wife; Prithvi, Badho and Vardaan's mother; Payal, Lucky and Pragya's mother-in-law (2016–2018)
Juhi Aslam as Arshpreet "Chhoto" Singh Ahlawat: Kailash and Raghubir's sister; Rana, Lucky and Pragya's aunt (2016–2018)
Arsha Goswami as Bharpai 
Rupali Ganguly as Payal Gupta / Payal Prithvi Singh: Prithvi's wife; Shamsher and Jamuna's daughter-in-law (2016–2018)
Zeena Bhatia as Laxmi Paresh Gupta:
Jaswinder Kumar as Jitesh Solanki
 Ankush Bhaskar as Ajay, Lucky's Friend 
 Paras Chhabra as Tejinder Singh (Teji/Jatta), Pragya's ex-lover 
Shagun Pandey as Vardaan Singh, Badho's Brother, Pragya's Husband
 Rahul Ranaa as Vijay (bad guy) villain, Pradhan Singh's son family enemy

Guest cast
Ghanshyam Tilawat as ex-Sarpanch
Rajeev Singh as Sangram Singh 
Sapnaa Nahar as Sita
Kanika Mann as Titli (2018)
Yasemin Delikan as Margery (2016)
Ankit Arora as Balwinder Singh, Rana's Wrestling Coach (2017)
Ram Mehar Jangra as Producer Kapoor (2017)
Jaya Bhattacharya as Sushma (2018)
R J Alok as Radio Jockey (2017)
Arti Singh as Amba (2016, 2017)
Shweta Mehta as Lavina (2017)

Adaptations

References

External links
Official website

2016 Indian television series debuts
Hindi-language television shows
Indian drama television series
Indian television soap operas
&TV original programming
2018 Indian television series endings